The members of the 8th Manitoba Legislature was elected in the Manitoba general election held in July 1892. The legislature sat from February 2, 1893, to December 11, 1895.

The Liberals led by Thomas Greenway formed the government.

William A. Macdonald served as Leader of the Opposition in 1893. After Macdonald's election was overturned, John Andrew Davidson became opposition leader in 1894. Davidson was subsequently unseated and James Fisher served as de facto opposition leader during the period that followed.

Samuel Jacob Jackson was speaker for the assembly until January 1895. Finlay McNaughton Young succeeded Winram as speaker.

There were three sessions of the 8th Legislature:

John Christian Schultz was Lieutenant Governor of Manitoba.

Members of the Assembly 
The following members were elected to the assembly in 1892:

Notes:

By-elections 
By-elections were held to replace members for various reasons:

Notes:

References 

Terms of the Manitoba Legislature
1893 establishments in Manitoba
1895 disestablishments in Manitoba